Viktor Alekseevich Vlasov (born 11 June 1951) is a former Soviet sport shooter and Olympic champion.

He received a gold medal in 50 m rifle 3 pos at the 1980 Summer Olympics in Moscow.

References

1951 births
Living people
Russian male sport shooters
Soviet male sport shooters
ISSF rifle shooters
Olympic shooters of the Soviet Union
Shooters at the 1980 Summer Olympics
Olympic gold medalists for the Soviet Union
Olympic medalists in shooting

Medalists at the 1980 Summer Olympics